Martín Casado is a Spanish-born American software engineer, entrepreneur, and investor. He is a general partner at Andreessen Horowitz, and was a pioneer of software-defined networking, and a co-founder of Nicira Networks.

Early life and education

Martín Casado was born around 1976 in Cartagena, Spain. He received his bachelor's degree from Northern Arizona University in 2000. In 2017, he received an honorary doctorate from the same university.  He worked for Lawrence Livermore National Laboratory doing computational science followed by work with the intelligence community from December 2000 to September 2006.  
Casado attended Stanford University from 2002 to 2008, earning both his Masters and PhD in computer science.
While at Stanford, he began development of OpenFlow, an open source protocol that enabled software-defined networking. During this period, he co-founded Illuminics Systems with Michael J. Freedman. His PhD thesis, "Architectural Support for Security Management in Enterprise Networks,” under advisors Nick McKeown, Scott Shenker and Dan Boneh, was published in 2008.

Career
In 2007, Casado co-founded Nicira Networks along with McKeown and Shenker, a Palo Alto, California based company working on network virtualization.  
Along with McKeown and Shenker, Casado promoted software-defined networking. His PhD work at Stanford University led to the development of the OpenFlow protocol, which was promoting using the term software-defined networking (SDN).
McKeown and Shenker co-founded the Open Networking Foundation (ONF) in 2011 to transfer control of OpenFlow to a not-for-profit organization.

In July 2012, VMware acquired Nicira for $1.26 billion. 
At VMware he was made a fellow and held the positions chief technology officer (CTO) for networking and security and general manager of the Networking and Security Business Unit.

Casado was a 2012 recipient of the Association for Computing Machinery (ACM) Grace Murray Hopper Award as for helping create the Software Defined Networking movement.

In 2015 Casado, McKeown and Shenker received the NEC C&C Foundation award for SDN and OpenFlow. In 2015, he was selected for Forbes’ “Next Gen Innovators 2014.” 
Casado left VMware and joined venture capital firm Andreessen Horowitz in February 2016 as its ninth general partner. 
Andreessen Horowitz had been one of the investors Nicira, contributing $17.7 million to the start-up venture.

References

External links

Northern Arizona University alumni
Stanford University alumni
1970s births
Living people